is a Japanese professional footballer who plays for Spartak Subotica in the Serbian Superliga. He mainly operates as a defensive midfielder, while being capable of playing as a defender as well.

Club career

Montenegro
Born in Kawagoe, Saitama, Japan, Shimura moved to Montenegrin First League in February 2015. Previously, he had played with university team in his home country. After six-month period with Berane making 11 appearances, he moved to Mornar. Shimura noted 35 appearances in both Montenegrin domestic competitions for the 2015–16 season, scoring a goal in 2–1 away victory over Zeta on 20 November 2015. Next the short spell with Bokelj in 2016 and both of matches in the first qualifying round for 2016–17 UEFA Europa League against Vojvodina he spent on the bench as an unused substitution, Shimura joined Sutjeska Nikšić for the league part of the same season. Playing for the club he noted 31 league matches with 1 goal, as also 7 matches with 1 goal in the Montenegrin Cup, including the final game against Grbalj after which Sutjeska won the competition. Behind the end of a season, he left the club.

Spartak Subotica
After several season playing in Montenegro, Shimura moved to Serbia and joined Spartak Subotica in summer 2017, penning a three-year professional contract with new club. Shimura made his Serbian SuperLiga debut in opening match of the 2017–18 season, in 2–1 home win versus OFK Bačka under coach Aleksandar Veselinović, when he also noted an assist for a goal. Making an official appearance for Spartak, Shimura became the first Japanese footballer in the club history. Shimura scored his first goal for the club in 2–0 away victory over Rad. As a coincidence, Shimura also scored his next goal for the club in 2–0 win against the same opponent on 18 March 2018. Finally, Shimura scored his third season goal in 2–0 away victory over Vojvodina on 22 April 2018.

Career statistics

Honours
Sutjeska Nikšić
Montenegrin Cup: 2016–17

References

External links
 
 
 
 

1993 births
Living people
Japanese footballers
Japanese expatriate footballers
Japanese expatriate sportspeople in Montenegro
Japanese expatriate sportspeople in Serbia
Expatriate footballers in Montenegro
Expatriate footballers in Serbia
Association football midfielders
FK Berane players
FK Mornar players
FK Bokelj players
FK Sutjeska Nikšić players
Montenegrin First League players
FK Spartak Subotica players
Serbian SuperLiga players
J2 League players
FC Machida Zelvia players